Rafael da Silva Francisco (born 4 August 1983 in Guarulhos), commonly known as  Rafinha , is a Brazilian footballer who plays as an attacking midfielder.

Style of play
Rafinha is known for his acceleration, speed, dribbling, finishing and ability with both feet. He primarily plays as either a central striker, winger or occasionally as an attacking midfielder

Honours
Goiás
Campeonato Goiano: 2009

Coritiba
Campeonato Paranaense: 2010, 2011, 2012, 2013
Campeonato Brasileiro Série B: 2010

Al-Shabab
Kings Cup: 2014
Saudi Super Cup: 2014

Cruzeiro
Copa do Brasil: 2017, 2018
Campeonato Mineiro: 2018, 2019

References

External links
Futebol de Goyaz profile 

Living people
1983 births
People from Guarulhos
Brazilian footballers
Association football midfielders
Campeonato Brasileiro Série A players
Campeonato Brasileiro Série B players
Associação Portuguesa de Desportos players
São Paulo FC players
Esporte Clube Santo André players
Grêmio Foot-Ball Porto Alegrense players
Associação Desportiva São Caetano players
Cruzeiro Esporte Clube players
Coritiba Foot Ball Club players
Al-Shabab FC (Riyadh) players
Brazilian expatriate footballers
Brazilian expatriate sportspeople in Saudi Arabia
Expatriate footballers in Saudi Arabia
Saudi Professional League players
Footballers from São Paulo (state)